Burgh-le-Marsh was a railway station on the East Lincolnshire Railway which served the town of Burgh le Marsh in Lincolnshire between 1848 and 1970. It originally opened as Burgh, but was renamed in 1923. Withdrawal of goods facilities took place in 1966, followed by passenger services in 1970. The line through the station is now closed.

History
This section was the last to be completed in September 1848 at an agreed cost of  £123,000. The station was provided with parallel platforms, with the main buildings, goods shed, cattle dock and signal box on the up (east) side. Immediately to the north of the station was a level crossing over the main road leading to Burgh, two miles to the south-east. A long refuge siding at the station was capable of holding 80 wagons. The July 1922 timetable saw six up and five down weekday services, plus one Sunday service each way, call at Burgh. The station was closed to goods traffic on 2 May 1966 and to passengers on 5 October 1970.

Present day
The station buildings and signal box have survived virtually intact in private ownership. The goods shed is also still standing and once housed a railway museum, now closed and whose contents have been dispersed. A section of the trackbed to the south between Burgh and Bratoft is owned by the National Trust and is open as a footpath. The trackbed to the north has been severed just beyond the station by the bypass around the village.

References

Sources

External links
Disused stations Burgh-le-Marsh

Disused railway stations in Lincolnshire
Railway stations in Great Britain closed in 1970
Railway stations in Great Britain opened in 1848
Former Great Northern Railway stations
Beeching closures in England